The Swinburne Ice Shelf, is an ice shelf just north of Edward VII Peninsula and the Alexandra Mountains in the southern part of Sulzberger Bay, Antarctica. It was photographed from aircraft and mapped by the Byrd Antarctic Expedition (ByrdAE), 1928–30. Named by Advisory Committee on Antarctic Names (US-ACAN) for Captain H.W Swinburne, Jr., Deputy Commander and Chief of Staff, U.S. Naval Support Force, Antarctica, during Operation Deep Freeze 1970 and 1971.

See also

 Ice shelves of Antarctica

References

Ice shelves of Antarctica
Bodies of ice of the Ross Dependency
King Edward VII Land